"Do It!" is a Japanese-language song recorded by Japanese singer songwriter Mai Kuraki, taken from her twelfth studio album Kimi Omou: Shunkashūtō (2018).. It was released on March 9, 2018 by Northern Music and served as the official fight song for 2018 Nagoya Women's Marathon, which was held on March 11, 2018. It was written by Kuraki and her long-time collaborator, Akihito Tokunaga.

Background
On February 27, 2018, Kuraki announced that she would release three singles "We Are Happy Women", "Do It!" and "Light Up My Life" respectively on three consecutive weeks.

These radio stations are based in Nagoya, where 2018 Nagoya Women's Marathon would take place.

On the day of the release of "We Are Happy Women", the official trailer for these three songs were uploaded on YouTube.

Live performance 
On March 11, 2018, Kuraki performed "Do It!" at the 2018 Nagoya Women's Marathon, which was held in Nagoya Dome.

Track listing

Charts

Daily charts

Weekly charts

Release history

References

2018 singles
Mai Kuraki songs
Songs written by Mai Kuraki
2018 songs
Songs with music by Akihito Tokunaga
Song recordings produced by Daiko Nagato